"One Promise Too Late" is a song written by Dave Loggins, Don Schlitz and Lisa Silver, and recorded by American country music artist Reba McEntire.  It was released in May 1987 as the third single from the album What Am I Gonna Do About You.  The song was McEntire's eighth number one country single as a solo artist.  The single went to number one for one week and spent a total of fourteen weeks on the country chart.

Content
The song tells the story of a woman who meets a man and falls in love, but she is already married and refuses to break her promise to her husband. She expresses regret that the man hadn't entered her life at a time when she could act on her love for him. Despite her inability to have the man of her dreams, she has no regret she met him, and he will live forever in her mind.

Charts

Weekly charts

Year-end charts

References
 

1987 singles
1986 songs
Reba McEntire songs
Songs written by Dave Loggins
Songs written by Don Schlitz
Song recordings produced by Jimmy Bowen
MCA Records singles
Songs written by Lisa Silver